Verdurette is a historic farmstead at 665 65th Avenue in New Boston, Illinois. The farm was established by William Drury, an early settler of New Boston who claimed the land in 1833. In addition to running his farm, Drury also operated a grocery store and a bank, and he served as county clerk and as a local postmaster. Drury built the farm's Gothic Revival farmhouse in 1855; the house features a large gable above the entrance with elaborate wooden trim. A Colonial Revival front porch was added to the house by 1909. The farm also includes a Gothic Revival bank barn, a second barn, a summer kitchen, a carriage house, a windmill, and a poultry coop.

The farm was added to the National Register of Historic Places on June 17, 2021.

References

Farms on the National Register of Historic Places in Illinois
National Register of Historic Places in Mercer County, Illinois
Gothic Revival architecture in Illinois
Houses completed in 1855